Leucothoe incisa is an amphipod in the family Leucothoidae. It lives at depths of up to  along the Atlantic coast of Europe from the Mediterranean Sea to Scotland, and in the North Sea. It is part of group of sibling species, together with Leucothoe lilljeborgi and Leucothoe occulta.

References

Gammaridea
Crustaceans described in 1892
Crustaceans of the Atlantic Ocean